Coreura cerealia is a moth of the subfamily Arctiinae. It was described by Druce in 1897. It is found in Ecuador.

The forewings are deep black and the hindwings are rich glossy deep blue, brightest near the base. The fringe is carmine red. The head, antennae, legs and thorax are deep black and the abdomen bright glossy blue.

References

Euchromiina
Moths described in 1897